The Bashkir or Bashkort (Bašǩort aty) is the horse breed of the Bashkir people. It is raised mainly within Bashkortostan, formerly known as Bashkiria, a republic within the Russian Federation which lies to the west of the southern Ural Mountains and extends to the Volga River. The principal centre of breeding is the capital, Ufa.

History 

The origins of the Bashkir horse are not known. In the nineteenth century its economic value was recognised, and steps were taken to increase both its working abilities and its traditional qualities as a producer of milk and meat. Breeding centres were set up in 1845.

The Bashkir horse has been crossed with other breeds of the former USSR such as the Russian Heavy Draught; experimental crosses with Kazakh and Yakut horses have also been made.

Bashkortostan has the third-highest horse population of the federal subjects of Russia, after the Altai Krai and the Sakha Republic. In 2003 the population of Bashkir horses was reported as 94,470; by early 2011 it had risen to almost 137,000.

Characteristics

The legs are short with heavy bone; cannon bone measurement may reach . The most common coat colours are bay, chestnut, mouse grey and roan. The mane and tail are thick and the coat is also thick and often curly. A two-year study published in 1990 found it unlikely that the North American Curly Horse, which also has a curly coat and may be called "American Bashkir Curly", descends from the Bashkir breed.

There are two distinct types: a smaller, lighter mountain type used mainly for riding, and a somewhat heavier steppe type.

The horses are remarkably hardy. Herds may be managed extensively, and remain in the open in winter in snow and blizzard conditions where temperatures may reach

Use 

The Bashkir is used for riding and for pack, harness, draught and farm work.

Mares are abundant producers of milk. Much of the milk is made into kumis; kumis-making is a national activity of the Bashkiri people.

Hair combed from the thick winter coat can be woven into cloth.

References

Horse breeds
Horse breeds originating in Russia